Peter Grosser (28 September 1938 – 2 March 2021) was a German football player and coach.

Club career 
As a player, he spent six seasons in the Bundesliga with TSV 1860 Munich, captaining the club for the 1965–66 Bundesliga title and scoring 49 goals in 130 West German top-flight appearances.

International career 
He also represented Germany on two occasions, in a 1966 FIFA World Cup qualifier against Sweden and in a friendly against Northern Ireland.

Death
Grosser died on 2 March 2021 at the age of 82.

Honours
 UEFA Cup Winners' Cup finalist: 1964–65
 Bundesliga: 1965–66
 DFB-Pokal: 1963–64

References

External links
 
 
 
 

1938 births
2021 deaths
German footballers
Germany international footballers
Association football midfielders
Germany B international footballers
Bundesliga players
FC Bayern Munich footballers
TSV 1860 Munich players
FC Red Bull Salzburg players
German football managers
SpVgg Unterhaching managers
Footballers from Munich
West German footballers
West German expatriate footballers
Expatriate footballers in Austria
West German expatriate sportspeople in Austria